King's Group is an international education and training company. It originated in Spain when King's College, Madrid was opened in 1969 by Roger Fry but is headquartered in Tenbury Wells in the United Kingdom

King's Group is the parent company of King's College schools and also owns other educational and non-educational entities: King's College, Madrid, King's College International, King's Training (Spain and Panama) and Nexalia Services.

In February 2014 King's Group was granted permission from the Department for Education (DfE) in London to sponsor Academies and Free Schools in England. This new area of the business is called King's Group Academies. Currently, there are five academies in the UK, with another set to open this year.

The business provides pre-school, primary and secondary education to nearly 8000 students of more than 80 nationalities, in the United Kingdom, Spain, Panama and Germany, and employs over 1200 education professionals, specialists and staff.

King's College schools give their pupils an academic, all-round liberal, Christian based education. The schools do not practice strong belief standings, but instead live by the values encased on the school crest of “Honestly, Faith and Courage”.

In 2018, King's Group were awarded the Education Investors Award, for being the winner in the Private Education Group of the Year category.

Company history
King's Group was initiated by British-born teacher Roger Fry (educationist) in 1969. The first school in the Group was opened in the Chamartín district of Madrid. The school initially opened its doors to 70 pupils in 1969, and by 1974 nearly 500 pupils attended the school. King's College soon outgrew its premises and by 1976 ten houses of differing size and design were in use in the Chamartín area of Madrid.

After occupying these premises for some nine years, the school moved in 1978 to its present, purpose-built premises in the residential area of Soto de Viñuelas (Tres Cantos), a 30-minute car journey from Madrid city centre.  The school maintained its title;

King’s College, The British School of Madrid (Soto de Viñuelas)
Since 1978, many improvements and additions were made to the school building, including a residential wing for boarding students, a 25m heated swimming pool, a 400-seat auditorium, a Music School and an Early Years Learning Centre.

King’s Infant School, The British School of Madrid (Chamartín)

The early 1980s saw a turning point in the Group's history, with the second school being added to the network, back in the area of the founding location of Chamartín.

King's Training

At the same time, a secondary facet of the Group was introduced: King's Training, addressing the need for adult language learning and coaching.

Nexalia Services

Five years later in 1987, Nexalia Services (formerly Servicios Lasalle) was inaugurated, an internal company to look after the growing catering and maintenance needs of the King's College schools.

In the 1990s the UK boarding school was added to the school network. It closed on the 30th of June 2020 as a consequence of the COVID-19 pandemic.

King’s College, The British School of Alicante

As the new century turned, the school network further increased, and a fourth school in the south of Spain was opened by Julio Herranz.

King's College International

In the same year, Sir Roger opened another company trading under King's Group, which offered courses to young children (not already pupils of a King's College school) to be able to study abroad for an academic year or attend a summer camp to learn English.

King’s College School, The British School of Madrid (La Moraleja)

In 2007, a third school in Madrid was purpose-built on the new development of land in the residential area of La Moraleja in Madrid.

King’s College, The British School of Murcia

In the same year the sixth school was added to Group, and the second in the south of Spain.

King’s College, The British School of Panama

In 2009, the Group celebrated its 40th anniversary, which was shortly followed in September 2012 by the opening of the seventh school in the network.

King's Training, Panama

While opening King's College, The British School of Panama, the Group also took the opportunity to establish an adult Training arm of the organisation. Aiming to optimise B2B resources, define strategies and deliver results.

King's Group Academies

In 2014 King's Group was granted permission from the Department for Education (DfE) in London to sponsor Academies and Free Schools in England.

King's Infant School, The British School of Elche

The ninth school in the Group was opened in September 2017, in Elche.

King's College, The British School of Latvia
The school, which will be the first British curriculum school in Latvia, was opened in September 2017.

King's College, The British School of Frankfurt 
King's College Frankfurt was opened in August 2018, in the town of Friedrichsdorf. And closed permanently in 2021.

Evolution of King's Group

References

Companies based in Worcestershire
Educational organisations based in England